The 2016 GSOC Tour Challenge was held from November 8 to 13 at the Western Financial Place and the Cranbrook Memorial Arena in Cranbrook, British Columbia. This was the second Grand Slam of the 2016–17 curling season.

The men's tier 1 final was the first ever men's Grand Slam final to feature two non-Canadian teams, as Sweden's Niklas Edin rink defeated Scotland's Kyle Smith team. Val Sweeting defeated Michelle Englot in the women's tier 1 final to win her second grand slam event.

The tier 2 winners Greg Balsdon and Jacqueline Harrison qualified for the 2017 Meridian Canadian Open later in the season.

Men

Tier 1

Teams

Round-robin standings
Final round-robin standings

Round-robin results

Draw 1
Tuesday, November 8, 7:00 pm

Draw 2
Wednesday, November 9, 8:30 am

Draw 3
Wednesday, November 9, 1:00 pm

Draw 4
Wednesday, November 9, 4:30 pm

Draw 5
Wednesday, November 9, 8:00 pm

Draw 6
Thursday, November 10, 8:30 am

Draw 7
Thursday, November 10, 1:00 pm

Draw 8
Thursday, November 10, 4:30 pm

Draw 9
Thursday, November, 8:00 pm

Draw 10
Friday, November 11, 8:30 am

Draw 11
Friday, November 11, 1:00 pm

Draw 12
Friday, November 11, 4:30 pm

Draw 13
Friday, November 11, 8:00 pm

Tiebreakers
Saturday, November 12, 8:00 am

Playoffs

Quarterfinals
Saturday November 12, 4:00pm

Semifinals
Saturday November 12, 8:00pm

Final
Sunday November 13, 1:30pm

Tier 2

Round-robin standings
Final round-robin standings

Tiebreakers
 Mark Bice 7–4  Bruce Mouat

Playoffs

Women

Tier 1

Teams

Round-robin standings
Final round-robin standings

Round-robin results

Draw 1
Tuesday, November 8, 7:00 pm

Draw 2
Wednesday, November 9, 8:30 am

Draw 3
Wednesday, November 9, 1:00 pm

Draw 4
Wednesday, November 9, 4:30 pm

Draw 5
Wednesday, November 9, 8:00 pm

Draw 6
Thursday, November 10, 8:30 am

Draw 7
Thursday, November 10, 1:00 pm

Draw 8
Thursday, November 10, 4:30 pm

Draw 9
Thursday, November 10, 8:00 pm

Draw 10
Friday, November 11, 8:30 am

Draw 11
Friday, November 11, 1:00 pm

Draw 12
Friday, November 11, 4:30 pm

Tiebreakers
Friday, November 11, 8:00 pm

Saturday, November 12, 8:00 am

Playoffs

Quarterfinals
Saturday November 12, 12:00 pm

Semifinals
Saturday November 12, 8:00pm

Final
Sunday November 13, 10:00am

Tier 2

Round-robin standings
Final round-robin standings

Tiebreakers
 Jacqueline Harrison 6–4  Hannah Fleming
 Cory Christensen 2–5  Diane Gushulak

Playoffs

References

External links

GSOC Tour Challenge
2016 in Canadian curling
Cranbrook, British Columbia
Curling in British Columbia
2016 in British Columbia
2016